OWB may refer to:

 Oracle Warehouse Builder
 Origyn Web Browser aka Odyssey Web Browser
 The IATA airport code for Owensboro-Daviess County Regional Airport in Owensboro, Kentucky, United States
 A handgun holster worn outside the waistband
Old World Blues, a DLC in 
Fallout: New Vegas

ÖWB may refer to:

 Österreichisches Wörterbuch (Austrian dictionary)